The Nottawasaga River is a river in Simcoe County and Dufferin County in Central Ontario, Canada. It is part of the Great Lakes Basin, and is a tributary of Lake Huron. The river flows from the Orangeville Reservoir in the town of Orangeville, Dufferin County, through the Niagara Escarpment and the Minesing Wetlands, the latter a wetland of international significance (Ramsar Convention site), and empties into Nottawasaga Bay, an inlet of Georgian Bay on Lake Huron, at the town of Wasaga Beach, Simcoe County.

The river takes its name from the Ojibwe word "Nottawasaga". Nottawa (or Naadowe in modern orthography)  means "Iroquois" and saga (zaagi in modern orthography) means "mouth of the river"; the word "Nottawasaga" (Naddowe-zaagi in modern orthography) was used by Algonquin scouts as a warning if they saw Iroquois raiding parties approaching their villages.

Thus,the name of the river, in Ojibwe is  Naadawe-zaaga-ziibi.

Watershed
The Nottawasaga River's headwaters originate in the Niagara Escarpment, Simcoe Uplands, Oak Ridges Moraine and Oro Moraine.

History
The Nottawasaga River is the resting home of HMS Nancy, a merchant schooner taken into the Royal Navy during the War of 1812. The small ship lost the battle but Lt. Miller Worsley and crew escaped. They rowed 360 miles to Fort Michilimackinac and three days later, Worsley returned with 92 men to take the Tigress and Scorpion. Since her sinking, an island formed around the Nancy. The hull is now preserved in a museum at Nancy Island Historic Site which is a part of Wasaga Beach Provincial Park.

Natural history
Fish ladders allow rainbow trout to reach spawning grounds on the upper river. The river is under the auspices of the Nottawasaga Valley Conservation Authority.

Tributaries
McIntyre Creek (left)
Little Marl Creek (right)
Marl Creek (right)
Willow Creek (right)
Mad River (left)
Bear Creek (right)
Pine River (left)
Boyne River (left)
Innisfil Creek (right)
Sheldon Creek (left)

References

Sources

External links

Nottawasaga Valley Conservation Authority

Rivers of Dufferin County
Rivers of Simcoe County
Tributaries of Georgian Bay
Rivers with fish ladders